"De Alde Friezen" is the anthem of the Friesland province of the Netherlands.

The text is by the Frisian writer Eeltsje Halbertsma. The version commonly sung today is an abridgement, dating from 1876, by Jacobus van Loon. The words were not set to music until after Halbertsma's death; they were first sung in 1875 at a ceremony held to commemorate his work. 
The song was adopted as the Frisian anthem by the Selskip foar Frysk Taal- en Skriftekennisse (Society for Frisian Language and Literature) on the urging of politician, writer and poet Pieter Jelles Troelstra (1860–1930) and has served as the anthem of Friesland ever since.

Lyrics

External links
Vocal rendition (MP3 file) (first stanza and chorus)
Vom hoh'n Olymp (the melody of which was used for De âlde Friezen)

Dutch anthems
Regional songs
Frisian culture
Culture of Friesland
West Frisian literature